The 2009–10 Fenerbahçe S.K. season was the club's 102nd season in its history and its 52nd consecutive year in the Süper Lig since its establishment. The season covered a period from July 2009 to June 2010. Having finished fourth in the Süper Lig the previous season, Fenerbahçe qualified for the rebranded UEFA Europa League third qualifying round and for the group stage of the rebranded Turkish Cup, the Ziraat Turkish Cup.

Previous season positions
The club competed in the 2008–09 Süper Lig, 2008–09 Turkish Cup in domestic and 2008–09 UEFA Champions League in European competitions. Fenerbahçe progressed past Hungarian side MTK Hungária in the second qualifying round, then defeated Serbian club Partizan in the third qualifying round to advance to the group stage. Fenerbahçe performed poorly in the group stage, gaining only two points from six matches and finishing last in Group G.

Team information

Club board

Staffs

Technical staff

Medical staff

Administrative staff 

Source: fenerbahce.org

Squad

Starting XI
4–2–3–1 Formation
<div style="position: relative;">

Current squad

(on loan)

(on loan)

(on loan)

Source: fenerbahçe.org and tff.org

Transfers

In

Out

Out on loan

Squad statistics

Matches

Süper Lig
Fenerbahçe played their 52nd consecutive season in the league. They competed with 17 other teams.

Results
All times at EET

1 See Ankaraspor Relegation
Source: tff.org

Standings

Results summary

Results by round

Turkish Super Cup
All times at EET

Source: tff.org

Ziraat Turkish Cup

Fenerbahçe participated in the 48th Turkish Cup starting in the group stages. Fenerbahçe completed the group stage. First Fenerbahçe matched with Bursaspor in quarterfinals. They won Bursaspor aggregate, 4–3. Then Fenerbahçe matched with Manisaspor in semifinals. They won Manisaspor aggregate, 3–1. Finally Fenerbahçe matched with Trabzonspor. They lost Trabzonspor 3-1 and had farewell the cup.
All times at EET

Group stage

Quarter-finals

Semi-finals

Final

Source: tff.org

UEFA Europa League
All times at CET

Third qualifying round

Play-off round

Group stage

Round of 32

Source: uefa.com

References

Fenerbahce
Fenerbahçe S.K. (football) seasons